Alexander Sammurtok (born 1952 or 1953) is a Canadian politician, who was elected to the Legislative Assembly of Nunavut in a by-election on February 10, 2014. Sammurtok first ran in the 2013 election, but finished in an exact tie with incumbent MLA Lorne Kusugak in the redistributed district of Rankin Inlet South.

He is the nephew of Tom Sammurtok, who was the MLA for the neighbouring electoral district of Rankin Inlet North-Chesterfield Inlet. Both Alexander and Tom Sammurtok were defeated in the 2017 Nunavut general election, Alexander by Kusugak and Tom by Cathy Towtongie; in the 2021 Nunavut general election, Alexander Sammurtok ran in Rankin Inlet North and defeated Towtongie.

References

Living people
Members of the Legislative Assembly of Nunavut
Inuit from the Northwest Territories
Inuit politicians
People from Rankin Inlet
21st-century Canadian politicians
Inuit from Nunavut
1950s births